The 2022 NCAA Division I baseball tournament was the 75th edition of the NCAA Division I Baseball Championship. The 64-team tournament began on Friday, June 3 as part of the 2022 NCAA Division I baseball season and concluded with the 2022 College World Series in Omaha, Nebraska, which started on June 17 and ended on June 27. Ole Miss swept Oklahoma to win their first national championship in program history.

The 64 participating NCAA Division I college baseball teams were selected out of an eligible 300 teams. 31 teams were awarded an automatic bid as champions of their conferences, and 33 teams were selected at-large by the NCAA Division I Baseball Committee. Teams were then divided into sixteen regionals of four teams, each of which conducted a double-elimination tournament. Regional champions then faced each other in Super Regionals, a best-of-three game series, to determine the eight participants in the College World Series.

Coppin State and Hofstra made their tournament debuts, while Air Force received their first bid since 1969. Mississippi State was the first defending champion to miss qualification to the tournament since Coastal Carolina in 2017. NC State joined Mississippi State as a 2021 College World Series participant that failed to qualify.

Tournament procedure 
A total of 64 teams entered the tournament, with 31 of them receiving an automatic bid by either winning their conference's tournament or by finishing in first place in their conference. The remaining 33 bids were at-large, with selections extended by the NCAA Selection Committee. For the first time ever, the Pac-12 Conference had a conference tournament to determine who will get the automatic bid.

National seeds
The sixteen national seeds were announced on the Selection Show on Monday, May 30 at 12 p.m. EDT on ESPN2. Teams in italics advanced to the Super Regionals. Teams in bold advanced to the 2022 College World Series.

 Tennessee
 Stanford
 Oregon State
 Virginia Tech
 Texas A&M
 Miami (FL) 
 Oklahoma State
 
 Texas
 North Carolina
 Southern Miss
 
 Florida
 Auburn
 Maryland
 Georgia Southern

Schedule and venues 
On May 29, the NCAA Division I Baseball Committee announced the sixteen regional host sites.

Regionals
June 3–6
Plainsman Park, Auburn, Alabama (Host: Auburn University)
UFCU Disch–Falk Field, Austin, Texas, (Host: University of Texas at Austin)
English Field, Blacksburg, Virginia, (Host: Virginia Polytechnic Institute and State University)
Boshamer Stadium, Chapel Hill, North Carolina, (Host: University of North Carolina at Chapel Hill)
Bob "Turtle" Smith Stadium, College Park, Maryland (Host: University of Maryland, College Park)
Olsen Field at Blue Bell Park, College Station, Texas, (Host: Texas A&M University)
Alex Rodriguez Park at Mark Light Field, Coral Gables, Florida, (Host: University of Miami)
Goss Stadium at Coleman Field, Corvallis, Oregon (Host: Oregon State University)
Condron Ballpark, Gainesville, Florida, (Host: University of Florida)
Clark–LeClair Stadium, Greenville, North Carolina, (Host: East Carolina University)
Pete Taylor Park, Hattiesburg, Mississippi, (Host: University of Southern Mississippi)
Lindsey Nelson Stadium, Knoxville, Tennessee, (Host: University of Tennessee)
Jim Patterson Stadium, Louisville, Kentucky, (Host: University of Louisville)
Klein Field at Sunken Diamond, Stanford, California (Host: Stanford University)
J. I. Clements Stadium, Statesboro, Georgia, (Host: Georgia Southern University)
O'Brate Stadium, Stillwater, Oklahoma (Host: Oklahoma State University–Stillwater)

Super Regionals
June 10–12
English Field, Blacksburg, Virginia, (Host: Virginia Polytechnic Institute and State University)
Olsen Field at Blue Bell Park, College Station, Texas, (Host: Texas A&M University)
Clark–LeClair Stadium, Greenville, North Carolina, (Host: East Carolina University)
Lindsey Nelson Stadium, Knoxville, Tennessee, (Host: University of Tennessee)
June 11–13
Boshamer Stadium, Chapel Hill, North Carolina, (Host: University of North Carolina at Chapel Hill)
Goss Stadium at Coleman Field, Corvallis, Oregon (Host: Oregon State University)
Pete Taylor Park, Hattiesburg, Mississippi, (Host: University of Southern Mississippi)
Klein Field at Sunken Diamond, Stanford, California (Host: Stanford University)

College World Series
June 16–27
Charles Schwab Field Omaha, Omaha, Nebraska, (Host: Creighton University)

Bids

Automatic bids

By conference

Regionals and Super Regionals
Bold indicates winner. Seeds for regional tournaments indicate seeds within regional.  Seeds for super regional tournaments indicate national seeds only.

Knoxville Super Regional

Greenville Super Regional

College Station Super Regional

Blacksburg Super Regional

Corvallis Super Regional

Hattiesburg Super Regional

Chapel Hill Super Regional

Stanford Super Regional

College World Series

The College World Series will be held at Charles Schwab Field  in Omaha, Nebraska.

Participants

Bracket

Game results

Bracket 1

Bracket 2

Finals

All-Tournament Team

Final standings

Seeds listed below indicate national seeds only

Record by conference

Media coverage

Radio
NRG Media will provide nationwide radio coverage of the Men's College World Series through its Omaha Station KOZN, in association with Westwood One. It also will stream all MCWS games at westwoodonesports.com, Tunein, the Varsity Network, and on SiriusXM.

Broadcast assignments
John Bishop, Gary Sharp, and Connor Happer (June 17–19) 
John Bishop, Damon Benning, and Gary Sharp (June 20–23 afternoon) 
Kevin Kugler, John Bishop, and Gary Sharp (June 20–23 evening) 
Kevin Kugler, Scott Graham, and John Bishop (Championship Series)

Television
ESPN will air every game from the Regionals, Super Regionals, and the College World Series across its networks.

Broadcast assignments 

Regionals

Tom Hart and Kyle Peterson: Auburn, Alabama
Mark Neely and Greg Swindell: Austin, Texas
Dani Wexelman and Lance Cormier: Blacksburg, Virginia
Eric Rothman and Jay Walker: Chapel Hill, North Carolina
Jon Meterparel and Danan Hughes: College Park, Maryland
Dave Neal and Todd Walker: College Station, Texas
Roy Philpott and Jon Jay: Coral Gables, Florida
John Schriffen and Kevin Stocker: Corvallis, Oregon

Steve Lenox and David Dellucci: Gainesville, Florida
Clay Matvick and Gregg Olson: Greenville, North Carolina
Sam Ravech and Nick Belmonte: Hattiesburg, Mississippi
Mike Monaco and Ben McDonald: Knoxville, Tennessee
Mike Couzens and Roddy Jones: Louisville, Kentucky
Roxy Bernstein and Xavier Scruggs: Stanford, California
Mike Morgan and Gaby Sánchez: Statesboro, Georgia
Lowell Galindo and Troy Eklund: Stillwater, Oklahoma

Super Regionals

John Schriffen and Lance Cormier: Blacksburg, Virginia
Mike Morgan and Gaby Sánchez: Chapel Hill, North Carolina
Mike Monaco and Chris Burke: College Station, Texas
Roxy Bernstein and Todd Walker: Corvallis, Oregon

Clay Matvick and Gregg Olson: Greenville, North Carolina
Dave Neal and Ben McDonald: Hattiesburg, Mississippi
Tom Hart and Kyle Peterson: Knoxville, Tennessee
Dave Flemming and Xavier Scruggs: Stanford, California

College World Series

Karl Ravech, Eduardo Pérez, Ben McDonald, and Dani Wexelman: June 17 & 18 afternoons
Mike Monaco, Ben McDonald, and Dani Wexelman: June 19 afternoon
Mike Monaco, Kyle Peterson, Chris Burke, and Kris Budden: June 17–19 evenings

Mike Monaco, Ben McDonald, Chris Burke, and Dani Wexelman: June 20–23 afternoons
Karl Ravech, Eduardo Pérez, Kyle Peterson, and Kris Budden: June 20–23 evenings

CWS Championship Series

Karl Ravech (Games 1) or Mike Monaco (Game 2), Kyle Peterson, Chris Burke, and Kris Budden

Notes

See also
 2022 NCAA Division I softball tournament
 2022 NCAA Division II baseball tournament
 2022 NCAA Division III baseball tournament

References

External links
Official Bracket at NCAA.com

 
Tournament
NCAA Division I baseball tournament
NCAA Division I Baseball Championship